Angelo Michele Toni (1640-January 16, 1708) was an Italian painter of the Baroque period.

He was born and active in Bologna. He started as a manuscript illuminator. He was a master of Antonio Dardani.

References

1640 births
1708 deaths
17th-century Italian painters
Italian male painters
18th-century Italian painters
Painters from Bologna
Italian Baroque painters
Manuscript illuminators
18th-century Italian male artists